Neild is a surname. Notable people with the surname include:

Chris Neild (born 1987), American football player
Edward F. Neild (1884–1955), American architect
James Neild (1744-1814), English jeweller and prison reformer, father of John Camden Neild
James Edward Neild (1824–1906), Australian doctor and theatre critic
John Neild (1846–1911), English-born Australian politician
John Camden Neild (1780–1852), English miser, son of James Neild
Robert Neild (1924–2018), British economist

See also
Nield